The Ideal Woman (German: Die ideale Frau) is a 1959 West German comedy film directed by Josef von Báky and starring Ruth Leuwerik, Martin Benrath and Boy Gobert.  Fanny Becker, the mayor of Rosenburg, meets a former lover and is tempted to resume her romance with him, but eventually decides to remain with her husband (the leader of the opposition in Rosenburg).

It was made at the Bavaria Studios in Munich. The film's sets were designed by the art directors Hans Jürgen Kiebach and Fritz Maurischat. Location shooting took place around Landshut and in Monaco.

Cast
 Ruth Leuwerik as Fanny Becker
 Martin Benrath as Axel Jungk
 Boy Gobert as Jaroslaw Martini
 Friedrich Domin as Justizrat Becker
 Agnes Windeck as Frau Jungk
 Heinrich Gretler as Stadtrat Niggelmann
 Paul Hoffmann as Stadtdirektor Rechnitz
 Lukas Ammann as Butler
 Hellmuth Haupt as Toni Adam 
 Käthe Itter as Anna 
 Anette Karmann as Evi Niggelmann

References

Bibliography
Hans-Michael Bock and Tim Bergfelder. The Concise Cinegraph: An Encyclopedia of German Cinema. Berghahn Books, 2009.

External links

1959 films
1959 comedy films
German comedy films
West German films
1950s German-language films
Films directed by Josef von Báky
Bavaria Film films
Films shot at Bavaria Studios
1950s German films